Singled Out: The Definitive Singles Collection is a compilation album by Welsh singer Shakin' Stevens, released in November 2020. It peaked at number 10 on the UK Albums Chart.

It was released as a 3-CD and a 2-LP set. The 3-CD release contains 54 tracks, featuring every single released by Stevens throughout his solo career after splitting from the Sunsets in 1977. The 2-LP release contains 26 tracks personally selected by Stevens and came with a card to download all 54 tracks.

Track listing

CD

LP

Charts

References

2020 compilation albums
Shakin' Stevens albums
BMG Rights Management albums
Sony BMG compilation albums